Pregnancy-specific beta-1-glycoprotein 10 is a protein that in humans is encoded by the PSG10 gene.

References

Further reading